Hanna-Maria Hintsa ( Seppälä born 13 December 1984) is a Finnish freestyle swimmer, who won the world title in the 100 m freestyle at the 2003 World Aquatics Championships in Barcelona, Spain.

Hanna-Maria started swimming at age five and made the Finnish national junior team by age 10. In 1999 she won the bronze medal in the European Junior Championships in the 50 m freestyle event. To date she has broken 100 Finnish national records. Hanna-Maria's manager is Finnish Sports Management Agency, SportElite.

Achievements

References

External links
 
 Hanna-Maria Seppälä's records and achievements
 Hanna-Maria Seppälä at SportElite
 

1984 births
Living people
People from Kerava
Finnish female freestyle swimmers
Olympic swimmers of Finland
Finnish female backstroke swimmers
Finnish female butterfly swimmers
Finnish female medley swimmers
Swimmers at the 2000 Summer Olympics
Swimmers at the 2004 Summer Olympics
Swimmers at the 2008 Summer Olympics
Swimmers at the 2012 Summer Olympics
Swimmers at the 2016 Summer Olympics
World Aquatics Championships medalists in swimming
Medalists at the FINA World Swimming Championships (25 m)
European Aquatics Championships medalists in swimming
Sportspeople from Uusimaa
20th-century Finnish women
21st-century Finnish women